Noyakert is a village in the Ararat Municipality of the Ararat Province of Armenia.

References

External links 
 
 World Gazeteer: Armenia – World-Gazetteer.com
 

Populated places in Ararat Province